Yedisan (also Jedisan or Edisan; , ,) was a conditional name for Özi [Pașa] Sancağı (Ochakiv Sanjak) of Silistra Eyalet, a territory located in today's Southern Ukraine between the Dniester and the Southern Bug (Boh), which was placed by the Ottomans under the control of the Nogai Horde in the 17th and 18th centuries and was named after one of the Nogai Hordes. In the Russian Empire, it was referred to as Ochakov Oblast, while the Ottoman Turks called it simply Özü after the city of Ochakiv which served as its administrative center. Another name used was Western Nogai.

Geographically, it was the western part of the so-called Wild Fields that sprawled to the north of the Black Sea between the Dniester and Dnieper rivers. It lies east of Budjak and Bessarabia, south of Podolia and Zaporizhzhia, and west of Taurida. Since the mid-20th century, the territory has been divided between southwestern Ukraine and southeastern Moldova (southern Transnistria).

Name
"Yedisan" is Turkic for "Seven Titles", doubtless the sept was made up of seven subgroups. Yedisan was also sometimes referred to as Ochakov Tartary after Ochakov (Ochakiv), the main fortress of the region. Names for the region in different language include: Ukrainian: Єдисан [Yedysan]; Russian: Едисан [Yedisan]; ; Crimean Tatar and Turkish: Yedisan; ; .

History
Earlier part of historic Podolia, sometime in the 17th century it was occupied by the Ottomans partitioning between Podolia Eyalet and Silistra Eyalet.

The area at times was incorporated into the Ottoman administrative structure as part of Silistra (Özi) Eyalet with the fortresses of Khadjibey (Odesa) and Özi (Ochakiv) as major centers. It was also part of a larger nomadic conflict between the Nogais who were clients of the Ottoman Porte and the Russian-sponsored Zaporizhian Cossacks. In the late 18th century, Imperial Russia under Catherine the Great began to expand into the area. As a result of the Russo-Turkish War of 1768-1774, the Ottomans ceded to Russia the region east of the Southern Bug.

Through the 1792 Treaty of Jassy (Iaşi) which concluded the Russo-Turkish War of 1787-1792, the Russian frontier was extended to the Dniester River and the takeover of Yedisan was complete.  Following the Russian takeover, the city of Odesa was founded in 1794 and the area was settled as part of New Russia by Moldavian, Russian and Ukrainian colonists along with a significant German element. The area came to form parts of the Kherson Governorate and is nowadays part of the Ukrainian Odesa and Mykolaiv oblasts, and of the southern breakaway Transnistria (de jure part of Moldova).

See also
 Black Sea Cossack Host

External links
 Tretiak, O.I. Birth of the city (Рождение города) (Ochakov Oblast). "Optimum". Odesa, 2004.

 
Historical regions in Russia
Historical regions in Ukraine
Historical regions in Moldova
Subdivisions of the Ottoman Empire
Ottoman period in Ukraine
Nogai people
History of the Black Sea
Vassal states of the Ottoman Empire
Turkic toponyms